M. edule may refer to:
 Memecylon edule, a small evergreen tree native to India
 Mesembryanthemum edule, a synonym for Carpobrotus edulis, the ice plant, highway ice plant, pigface or Hottentot fig, a plant species native to South Africa

See also 
 Edule (disambiguation)